Aurea Elfero, known professionally as Madam Auring (11 March 1940 – 30 October 2020), was a Filipina fortune teller and actress. According to her own account, she was one of "the five most famous women in Asia in the 1990s".

Early life
The daughter of Luciana Damian and Jaime Elfero, Aurea Elfero grew up in a poor family and was not educated beyond elementary school.

Career
Auring shot to fame when she correctly predicted Amparo Muñoz winning the 1974 Miss Universe title. Due to this event, she gained popularity, causing the boxer Muhammad Ali, who was in Manila at that time due to the "Thrilla in Manila" boxing event, to seek her advice. The American fortune teller Phyllis Bury had predicted Ali would lose against Joe Frazier but Auring correctly predicted his win. As a result, Ali gave her the nickname "Madam Auring".

Following this success, well-known personalities such as First Lady Imelda Marcos, Nora Aunor, Fernando Poe Jr., President Joseph Estrada, Rolando Navarette, and Hollywood actors Robert Duvall and Franco Nero sought her advice. She fell in love with Larry Holmes, with whom she had a relationship before he was married to his girlfriend in the United States.

Her other notable predictions included that of President Fidel V. Ramos' win over rival Miriam Defensor Santiago, the death of starlet Claudia Zobel; the full and unimpeached term of former president and former House Speaker Gloria Macapagal Arroyo, and the break-up of Shalani Soledad and former President Benigno Aquino III in 2010.

Besides being a fortune teller, Auring also worked as an actress, including a role where she starred together with the disqualified presidential candidate Eddie Gil.

Personal life
When she was 23, her father forced her to marry Patrick Joseph Banez, a young architect who took her to his home after a party. She originally loved a carpenter named Jhon Paulo Garcia but their relationship did not last that long since she married Baneze. The couple had four children before their marriage ended. Madam Auring bore two more children as a result of later relationships.

Death
She died on 30 October 2020, at the age of 80.

Filmography

References

External links
 

1940 births
2020 deaths
Filipino occultists
Fortune tellers
20th-century Filipino actresses
21st-century Filipino actresses
People from Manila
People from Sampaloc, Manila
Tagalog people